Hanna Kokko (born 1971) is a scientist and full professor at the University of Zurich. She works in the fields of evolution and ecology and is known for her research on the evolution and maintenance of sex, the feedback between ecology and evolution, and the evolutionary ecology of cancer.

Career
Kokko attended the Helsinki University of Technology for her undergraduate engineering degree. While there, she became interested in biology and decided to complete a one-year biology research Master's degree. She completed her Ph.D. at the University of Helsinki on the topic of sexual selection and the evolution of mate choice in 1997. During this time, she was mentored by William Sutherland.

Kokko has since held positions at the University of Cambridge, the University of Glasgow, the University of Jyväskylä, the University of Helsinki, and the Australian National University, and she is currently a professor in evolutionary ecology at the University of Zürich.

Awards and honors
Kokko's book Kutistuva turska (Shrinking Cod) was awarded the Finnish State Award for Public Information in 2009. She received the 2010  and the British Ecological Society's Founder's Prize.  In 2010, she was awarded an Australian Laureate Fellowship. She became a Fellow of the Australian Academy of Science in 2014 and won the Finnish Cultural Foundation's outstanding cultural achievement award in 2016. In 2020, she became an International Honorary Member of the American Academy of Arts and Sciences.

Selected publications
 Bargum, K. & Kokko, H. (2008).  , WSOY (fi). 
 Kokko, H. (2007). Modelling for Field Biologists (and Other Interesting People), Cambridge University Press. .

References

External links
 Homepage at University of Zurich
 Lab team website
 Google Scholar
 Twitter

Evolutionary biologists
Women evolutionary biologists
Mathematical ecologists
Finnish ecologists
Finnish skeptics
1971 births
Living people
Theoretical biologists
Fellows of the Australian Academy of Science
Fellows of the American Academy of Arts and Sciences
Academic staff of the University of Helsinki
Academic staff of the Australian National University
Academic staff of the University of Zurich
Finnish women academics